The 1957 Los Angeles Rams season was the team's 20th year with the National Football League and the 12th season in Los Angeles.

Season highlights 

The Los Angeles Rams set an all-time National Football League attendance record in 1957, playing before a total of 1,051,106 fans in a total of 19 home and away games, including pre-season contests. This attendance total exceeded any previous cumulative total for an American football team at any level of competition, including the college and professional levels. Topping the one game record, the team drew an astounding 102,368 fans to the Los Angeles Memorial Coliseum to see a November 10 contest between the Rams and their in-state rivals, the San Francisco 49ers.

The 1957 season would be the last in a Rams uniform for quarterback and punter Norm Van Brocklin, the team's starting signal caller since 1950. Van Brocklin passed for 20 touchdowns on the year, gaining 2,105 yards in the air, but gave up 21 costly interceptions, contributing to the team's 4th-place finish in the Western Conference. The team also parted ways at the end of the 1957 season with top receiver Elroy Hirsch, a veteran of 9 NFL seasons.

Defensively, the Rams limited their opponents to nearly 300 fewer yards on the ground and 75 yards via the pass than the totals put up by themselves. The pass defense was headed by linebacker Les Richter, who led the team with 4 interceptions.

Schedule

Standings

Footnotes 

Los Angeles Rams
Los Angeles Rams seasons
Los Angeles